Carl David DeMaio (born September 14, 1974) is an American politician from San Diego, California. DeMaio hosts a radio show on NewsRadio 600 KOGO. He also founded and served as Chairman of Reform California, a conservative political action committee.

A member of the Republican Party, DeMaio served a single term as a member of the San Diego City Council, representing District 5 from 2008 to 2012. DeMaio was a candidate for Mayor of San Diego in the 2012 election, but lost to former congressman Bob Filner. He ran for California's 52nd congressional district in the 2014 election, but lost narrowly to incumbent Scott Peters. On August 5, 2019, DeMaio announced he would run for Congress in 2020 to represent the 50th district, running against incumbent Congressman Duncan D. Hunter, a fellow Republican. Hunter announced his resignation from Congress on December 6, 2019, which became effective January 13, 2020. In the primary election on March 3, 2020, DeMaio failed to qualify for the November runoff.

Early life and education 
DeMaio was born in 1974 in Dubuque, Iowa to a pair of teachers, Carl Joseph DeMaio and Diane M. DeMaio (née Elgin). He and his family moved to Orange County, California in the late 1970s. He attended St. Catherine's Military Academy, a Catholic school in Anaheim, through eighth grade. In 1989, he got a scholarship to Georgetown Preparatory School, a Jesuit boarding school in Maryland. His mother died of breast cancer in 1990 when he was 15 years old; his father abandoned the family two weeks prior to her death.

DeMaio became separated from his brother and sister and began attending Georgetown Prep. He graduated in 1993, then attended Georgetown University's School of Foreign Service, where he received a degree in international politics and business in 1996.

Early career 
After college, he established The Performance Institute, a for-profit think tank that provided training for government officials on performance measurement, strategic planning, zero-based budgeting, project management and other management improvement topics. In 2003 DeMaio founded a second company, the American Strategic Management Institute, which provided financial and management training to corporations. He sold both companies to the Thompson Publishing Group in late 2007.

DeMaio is married to Jonathan Hale, owner of Hale Media which publishes San Diego Gay and Lesbian News and SDPix.

Radio hosting and podcast 
In April 2015, DeMaio joined KOGO Radio (AM-600), first as a co-host with Bob Sullivan of a midday radio show (1-4 pm) with Bob Sullivan, and then starting in November 2015 as a solo host of his own show during the afternoon drive (3-6pm).

In addition to offering commentary on news and politics as a traditional radio host, DeMaio has used his radio show platform to promote and advance a number of political causes and campaigns.  In January 2018 DeMaio signed a new five-year contract with KOGO. In August 2019, he took a leave of absence to launch his 2020 Congressional race and began airing his own Podcast as a way to stay connected with his followers. "The Carl DeMaio Show" airs one to two episodes a week and is available on platforms such as Spotify and Apple Podcasts.

Government reform advocacy 
Between 1994-1999, DeMaio worked for the Congressional Institute, serving as the Institute's Director of Planning. In this position DeMaio developed training programs and retreats for Members of Congress and their staff on the budget process and ways to conduct oversight investigations of federal programs using the Government Performance and Results Act.

In 2000, DeMaio joined the Reason Foundation to lead a project to develop a bipartisan management improvement plan for the incoming Presidential Administration. C-Span broadcast a series of Townhall hosted by DeMaio that eventually led to a management reform plan that was accepted by incoming President George W. Bush.

DeMaio moved to San Diego in 2002. That year he appeared on behalf of the Reason Foundation in front of the San Diego City Council to present an award to the city for having the most efficient government in California. He later alleged this award was based on "false and misleading" financial data provided to him by the city.

In 2004, DeMaio launched the San Diego Citizens Budget Project that issued a report claiming that San Diego's predicted budget deficit of $27 million was in fact closer to $80–$100 million.[5] The report also advocated for change in San Diego's budget process. Between 2004 and 2012, DeMaio was Chairman of San Diego Citizens for Accountable Government – a 527 political action committee that raised funds to oppose tax increases and sponsor policy research and initiatives to reform government in San Diego county. In 2015, DeMaio launched Reform California – a 527 political action committee that raises funds to oppose tax increases and sponsor policy research and initiatives to reform government throughout California. DeMaio serves as Chairman and principal officer for Reform California. In 2015 DeMaio, warning that unfunded government pension liabilities were growing too large, announced Reform California would partner with former San Jose Mayor Chuck Reed to propose and pass a statewide Pension Reform Initiative.

Josh Newman recall effort

In 2017 DeMaio announced a recall against Democratic state senator Josh Newman citing Newman's vote for the car and gas tax increases. DeMaio led a coalition to collect more than 65,000 signatures to force a recall onto the June 2018 ballot. The recall won with 59% of the vote and Newman was replaced by Ling-Ling Chang. It was the first successful recall of a California state senator in over 104 years.

Gas Tax Repeal Initiative

In 2018 DeMaio led the effort to qualify the Gas Tax Repeal Initiative and his group successfully collected almost 1 million signatures and got the Initiative qualified for the November 2018 ballot. The measure, titled Prop 6 on the ballot, lost by a 55-45% vote. While polls showed strong support for the gas tax repeal, DeMaio blamed the loss on what he claimed was a misleading ballot title placed on the initiative by the Attorney General that excluded the words gas, tax, and repeal. A 2018 study done by Inewsource showed DeMaio's Reform California has more than 25,000 donors, raised over $2 million that year, and had more than one-third of its donors give $100 or less.

He later proposed a followup ballot measure to the Gas Tax Repeal campaign. His proposal would create a “lockbox” so that gasoline and diesel taxes are spent only on road projects, steer sales taxes from automobile purchases to regional transportation agencies, and enact cost-saving changes to infrastructure planning and construction.

Political career

San Diego City Council
DeMaio ran for the termed-out Brian Maienschein's District 5 San Diego City Council seat in the nonpartisan 2008 election. At the time, District 5 included the neighborhoods of Rancho Bernardo, Carmel Mountain Ranch, Sabre Springs, Mira Mesa, Sorrento Mesa, Scripps Ranch, and San Pasqual Valley.

He won the seat in the June primary election, defeating his opponent, former Solana Beach Fire Chief George K. George, with 66% of the vote. DeMaio was the first openly gay man to be elected to the council, and the first Italian American elected to office in the city of San Diego since the 1930s.

As a council member, DeMaio was vice chair of three committees: the Natural Resources and Culture Committee, the Budget and Finance Committee, and the Audit Committee.

While a member of the City Council, DeMaio released a number of studies and proposals on city employee compensation packages and pension benefits, arguing that salaries and benefits of city employees should be reduced to levels consistent with the local labor market. He opposed a proposal to build a new San Diego central library, saying the city could not afford it.

DeMaio also proposed a Sunshine Act, which passed the City Council with unanimous support. The ordinance imposed new disclosure and transparency reforms on city government.

DeMaio was the primary author of San Diego's June 2012 Proposition B, titled "Amendments to the San Diego City Charter Affecting Retirement Benefits," and he led the drive to put it on the ballot. Proposition B proposed (1) limiting of compensation used to calculate city employee pension benefits; (2) eliminating defined-benefit pensions for many new city employees, substituting a defined-contribution (401(k)-style) plan; (3) requiring substantially equal pension contributions from the City and employees; and (4) eliminating the right of employees/retirees to vote to change their benefits. Proposition B was approved by San Diego voters by a 2-to-1 margin on June 5, 2012.

In 2010, DeMaio supported the addition of a citizen initiative called "Competition and Transparency in City Contracts", which would require the city to seek competitive bids for some services and allow the city to outsource without the involvement of unions. However, the measure was rejected by the county registrar of voters after a random sample concluded that DeMaio had not gathered enough valid signatures. After the ballot measure was rejected, San Diego CityBeat reported that a committee called "Reforming City Hall with Carl DeMaio" had paid $16,000 to Hale Media Inc., a company owned by DeMaio's boyfriend, for signature gathering. When CityBeat contacted Jonathan Hale, he said he hadn't done any paid work for the campaign, but had only volunteered and taken photos. A campaign spokesperson said the money was reimbursement to Hale Media for paying the interns who were collecting signatures.

DeMaio also campaigned against a proposal to boost the city's sales tax by a half-a-billion dollars over five years. He argued instead to reduce the budget deficit through spending cuts and pension reform.

2012 mayoral election

In 2011, DeMaio filed papers declaring his intention to run for Mayor of San Diego in 2012, when mayor Jerry Sanders would be retiring due to term limits.

In June 2011, he formally declared his candidacy. He was endorsed by the San Diego County Republican Party in March 2012. In the June 5 primary he placed first with 31.42% of the vote and advanced to a runoff election against U.S. Representative Bob Filner in November.

The U-T San Diego published a front-page endorsement of DeMaio before the June 2012 primary. The Voice of San Diego described the endorsement as unprecedented: "Actually, they weren't even on the front page — the editorials were wrapped around the page as though they were even more important."

On September 25, 2012, Sanders endorsed DeMaio to be his successor. At the time of the endorsement, a 10News and SurveyUSA poll of voters gave Filner a twelve-point lead over DeMaio.

On Election Day, DeMaio lost to Filner, 52.5% to 47.5%.

2014 congressional election

On May 30, 2013, DeMaio announced his intention to run for Congress in 2014 against incumbent Scott Peters. DeMaio was one of three openly gay Republican candidates for Congress in the 2014 elections. In February 2014, he became the first congressional candidate to feature his same-sex partner in a campaign ad.

In September 2013, he considered running for Mayor of San Diego in a November 2013 special election, called because of Filner's resignation, but decided to stay in the race for Congress. The month before the primary election, the campaign office of DeMaio was broken into; an affidavit signed by a San Diego Police Department detective, unsealed after the November 2014 election, stated the belief that Todd Bosnich was the culprit of the campaign office burglary. Also revealed in the unsealing, was that documents from the DeMaio campaign were received by the Scott Peters campaign manager in June, copied, and then turned over to the police "days later".

In the June 2014 primary, he came in second to Peters with 36% of the vote, ensuring DeMaio a place on the ballot in the November 2014 general election. Peters received 42% of the vote. In a poll conducted by SurveyUSA for the San Diego Union-Tribune and 10News during September 11–15, 2014, DeMaio and Peters were in a virtual dead heat with Peters polling at 47% and DeMaio at 46%. The same poll taken October 2–6 was again described as a dead heat, with DeMaio showing a 3-point lead over Peters – within the margin of error. An earlier Survey USA poll showed Peters leading by one point.

In October, a former campaign worker on DeMaio's campaign that was implicated in an investigation into the previous break-in and to DeMaio's office, Todd Bosnich, charged DeMaio with sexual harassment, saying that DeMaio had masturbated in front of him and touched him inappropriately. DeMaio denied the allegations, saying they were made after Bosnich had been terminated for plagiarism and subsequently vandalized campaign headquarters. DeMaio claimed that Bosnich was building his story on a previous unsubstantiated accusation that had been made in August 2013, when former City Council colleague and political opponent Ben Hueso claimed that he had twice seen DeMaio masturbating in a public restroom; DeMaio dismissed that allegation as a "vicious rumor." On October 20, the San Diego County District Attorney declined to file charges against either DeMaio or Bosnich. At the same time, it was reported that the FBI was investigating various claims by Bosnich, related to evidence he claimed would substantiate his sexual harassment allegations against DeMaio. In June 2015, Bosnich admitted that he had faked threatening emails he claimed were from DeMaio, and pleaded guilty to one count of obstruction of justice – a federal felony count; In November 2015, US District Judge Larry Alan Burns sentenced Bosnich to probation, community service, a fine, and mental health counseling. "The victim is Mr. DeMaio, DeMaio's campaign or the democratic process." U.S. District Judge Larry Burns said in his ruling. The US Attorney's Office stated Bosnich's sent the fabricated emails to himself "to bolster his claims that DeMaio was threatening him to remain silent about the alleged sexual harassment. In this fashion, Defendant's claims about DeMaio's sexual harassment appeared not only to be legitimate, but to take on a new and, perhaps, more sinister context."

In early November, another former staffer, Justin Harper (then aged 25), accused DeMaio of sexual misconduct inside a bathroom at DeMaio's campaign headquarters. DeMaio denied the accusations, noting that Harper's girlfriend-at-the-time had been terminated by the campaign and that Harper had quit several weeks later. Voice of San Diego attempted to follow up on the accusation in December 2014, but did not find anything conclusive supporting either Harper or DeMaio.

Although DeMaio led by 751 votes on election night, about 148,000 provisional and mail-in ballots remained to be counted. By the end of the week, Peters led the race by nearly 4,500 votes, with only 10,000 ballots left to be counted. At that point, the Associated Press called the race for Peters. The final result was Peters 51.59% and DeMaio 48.41%.

2020 congressional election

On August 5, 2019, DeMaio announced his candidacy for California's 50th congressional district in the 2020 election, then occupied by Congressman Duncan Hunter, a fellow Republican who was indicted for misusing campaign funds a month prior. An October poll found DeMaio to be polling ahead of Hunter and other Republican challengers. Hunter pleaded guilty to campaign finance violations in December 2019 and announced he would resign from Congress. His resignation became effective January 13, 2020. The March 3 primary election for the vacant seat pitted DeMaio against Democrat Ammar Campa-Najjar and Republicans Darrell Issa and Brian Jones. The top two vote getters regardless of party go on to the general election. DeMaio came in third, so that Campa-Najjar and Issa competed in the November election. DeMaio threw his support behind Issa, his chief primary opponent, who placed second in the primary with 23.5% of the votes and went on to win the general election.

Political positions
He has stated his intent to propose a "No Budget, No Pay" law that would permanently penalize the pay of Members of Congress and political appointees in the White House when they fail to pass a budget on time."

According to the National Journal, he "has voiced support for gay marriage, abortion rights, and environmental protections." He announced his support for same-sex marriage after 2008, has participated in LGBT Pride, and was endorsed by Log Cabin Republicans, a PAC supportive of LGBT rights. DeMaio has called himself "constitutionally libertarian" on the issue of abortion saying that Roe v. Wade is settled precedent in the law, and that he supports the Hyde Amendment to prohibit federal funding for abortions.

On gun control, DeMaio has stated that he supports "full enforcement of existing laws as well as more resources to keep guns out of the hands of criminals and those with mental health disorders."

His campaign proposals for the 2020 campaign included a call to secure the border through a five-point initiative of fencing and walls, reform to the immigration and asylum system, ending Sanctuary cities, withholding federal funds from any state or local government that provides taxpayer-funded benefit for illegal immigrants, enforcing the E-verify program, and vetting legal immigrants through a merit-based process. He proposed a "Freedomcare" health insurance system to replace Obamacare, allowing individuals to buy health insurance across state lines and putting the government exchanges under private management. His "Fix Congress First Initiative" would "force Congress to live under the same laws as the rest of us." He proposes national legislation that would encourage Americans to carry weapons, after undergoing background checks, to combat mass shootings. Details include mandatory self-defense training in all schools, a national concealed-carry permit program, and better background checks.

References

External links
 Congressional campaign website
 Performance Institute

1974 births
American people of Italian descent
California Republicans
Candidates in the 2012 United States elections
Candidates in the 2014 United States elections
Gay politicians
Walsh School of Foreign Service alumni
LGBT Christians
American LGBT city council members
LGBT conservatism in the United States
LGBT people from Iowa
LGBT people from California
Living people
Politicians from Dubuque, Iowa
Politicians from San Diego
San Diego City Council members
Candidates in the 2020 United States elections
21st-century LGBT people